Chicken Nugget is an upcoming South Korean streaming television series directed by Lee Byeong-heon, starring Ryu Seung-ryong, Ahn Jae-hong, and Kim Yoo-jung. The series, based on the Naver Webtoon of the same name, is a comic mystery chase drama about the struggles of a father to recover his daughter who entered a mysterious machine and turned into a chicken nugget, assisted by a man who has a crush on her.

Synopsis 
Choi Min-ah (Kim Yoo-jung), the daughter of a company president, mistakes a new machine as a device which helps her with her fatigue, and she is accidentally turned into a chicken nugget. As her father, Choi Seon-man (Ryu Seung-ryong) and intern Go Baek-joong (Ahn Jae-hong) who has a crush on her, try to turn her back into a human, they discovers unexpected secrets.

Cast

Main 
 Ryu Seung-ryong as Choi Seon-man
 The president of All Machines, who tries to turn his daughter back into a human.
 Ahn Jae-hong as Baek-joong
 An intern who has a crush on his boss's daughter, Min-ah.

Special appearance 
 Kim Yoo-jung as Choi Min-ah
 Choi Seon-man's daughter who enters a mysterious machine thinking it is a fatigue recovery machine and turns into a chicken nugget.
 Jung Ho-yeon

Production 
In November 2022, it was reported that filming is currently in progress.

Notes

References

External links
 
 Chicken Nugget at Daum 

Upcoming Netflix original programming
Korean-language Netflix original programming
Television shows based on South Korean webtoons
2023 South Korean television series debuts
South Korean comedy television series
South Korean mystery television series
South Korean web series
2023 web series debuts